Amina Figarova (born 1964) is an Azerbaijani jazz pianist. Trained as a classical pianist in Baku, she became interested in the local folk music, later specializing in jazz. Since the late 1980s, together with her husband, the flutist Bart Platteau, she has performed in jazz festivals around the world.

Biography
Born in Baku on 2 December 1964, Amina Figarova learnt to play the piano as a small child and began composing when only six. She attended the Baku Academy of Music where she studied to become a classical concert pianist. In 1988, while at the Moscow Jazz Festival, she was invited to study at the Rotterdam Conservatoire where she soon developed an interest in jazz. She completed her education at the Berklee College of Music in Boston.

While in the United States, she became involved in the Thelonious Monk Jazz Colony in Aspen, Colorado. Together with the flutist Bart Platteau whom she later married, she began to perform in jazz concerts around the world.

Her albums September Suite and more recently Blue Whisper were inspired in part by the events of 11 September 2001 when she was in New York playing at the Blue Note Jazz Club. Chicago critic Neil Tesser rates her as one of the leading contemporary jazz composers both with September Suite and Come Escape With Me.

Figarova's compositions include the musical Diana, and Tehora which she wrote for the Israeli singer Shlomit Butbul. She has released 13 albums, becoming one of DownBeat'''s Rising Star Composers of the year in both 2014 and 2015.

Discography
 Rachmaninov/Skriabin/Wieniawski (Erasmus, 1993)
 Attraction (1995)
 Another Me (Munich, 1998)
 Firewind (Munich, 1999)
 Night Train (Munich, 2002)
 On Canal Street (STR, 2002)
 Come Escape with Me (Munich, 2005)
 September Suite (Munich, 2005)
 Above the Clouds (Munich, 2008)
 Sketches (Munich, 2010)
 Twelve (In+Out, 2012)
 Blue Whisper (In+Out, 2015)
 Road to the Sun (AmFi, 2018)
 Persistence'' (AmFi, 2020)

References

1964 births
Living people
Musicians from Baku
21st-century pianists
Soviet emigrants to the United States
Azerbaijani women composers
Azerbaijani jazz pianists
Azerbaijani women pianists
Baku Academy of Music alumni
Berklee College of Music alumni
Jazz pianists
Women jazz pianists
21st-century women pianists